The Peruvian Navy (abbreviated MGP) is the branch of the Peruvian Armed Forces tasked with surveillance, patrol and defense on lakes, rivers and the Pacific Ocean up to  from the Peruvian littoral. Additional missions include assistance in safeguarding internal security, conducting disaster relief operations and participating in international peacekeeping operations.

The Marina de Guerra del Perú celebrates the anniversary of its creation in 1821 on October 8 and also commemorates the decisive Battle of Angamos, the final part of the naval campaign of the War of the Pacific between Peru and Chile at the end of 1879.

History

19th century

The Marina de Guerra del Perú was established on 8 October 1821 by the government of general José de San Martín. Its first actions were undertaken during the War of Independence (1821–1824) using captured Spanish warships. The Peruvian Naval Infantry was also formed during the war with Spain, performing successfully in their first battle where they seized Arica from the Spanish.

Shortly afterwards it was engaged in the war against the Gran Colombia (1828–1829) during which it conducted a blockade against the seaport of Guayaquil and then assisted in the subsequent Peruvian occupation. The Navy saw further action during the war of the Peru-Bolivian Confederacy (1836–1839) and during the Chincha Islands War with Spain (1866).

The breakout of the War of the Pacific (1879–1883) caught the Peruvian Navy unprepared and with inferior forces in comparison to the Chilean Navy. Even so, hit-and-run tactics carried out by Peruvian Admiral Miguel Grau, commander of the ironclad , famously delayed the Chilean advance by six months until his death and defeat at the Battle of Angamos.

20th century
Following the War of the Pacific, the Peruvian Navy had to be completely rebuilt. In 1900 the force consisted of only one cruiser of 1,700 tons displacement, a screw-driven steamer, and ten smaller ships – the latter described by a contemporary British publication as "of no real value". The lengthy process of expansion and rebuilding started in 1907 with the acquisition from the United Kingdom of the scout cruisers  and Coronel Bolognesi, followed by the arrival of two submarines, Ferré and Palacios, from France in 1911. During the Presidency of Augusto B. Leguía (1919–1930) a Navy Ministry was established as well as a Navy Aviation Corps, both in 1920.

Border conflicts with Colombia in 1911 and 1932 and a war with Ecuador in 1941 saw Peruvian warships involved in some skirmishes in support of the Army. The attack on Pearl Harbor brought World War II to the Pacific and even though Peru did not declare war on the Axis until 1945, its Navy was involved in patrol missions against possible threats by the Imperial Japanese Navy from early 1942 up to mid-1945.

During the 1970s and the first half of the 1980s the Peruvian Navy carried out a major buildup programme which allowed it to take advantage over its traditional rival, the Chilean Navy. The navy purchased one cruiser the BAP Almirante Grau (CLM-81) from the Netherlands, eight Carvajal-class frigates from Italy – four newly purchased and four ex-Lupo-class frigates – as well as six PR-72P-class corvettes from France. The buildup proved to be temporary due to the economic crisis of the second half of the 1980s, forcing the decommissioning of several warships and resulting in a general lack of funds for maintenance.

The economic upturn of the 1990s and into the 2000s would later permit some improvement, although at a reduced force level compared to the early 1980s.

21st century 

Into the 21st century, the Peruvian Navy began to modernize their ships. In 2008, the Type 209/1100 submarines were modernized while the Carvajal-class frigates began to be modernized in 2011. The Type 209/1200 submarines began to be modernized in late-2017 beginning with the BAP Chipana (SS-34).

SIMA has continued to construct ships for the Navy. In 2013, SIMA partnered with Posco Daewoo Corporation and Daesun Shipbuilding of South Korea to construct two Makassar-class landing platform docks. The , recently launched on 25 April 2017, as well as the BAP Paita which is currently under construction will provide Peru with increased expeditionary warfare capabilities, with the ability to accommodate multiple Landing Craft Vehicle Personnel, newly purchased LAV IIs and helicopters.

In 2018, a modernization program was initiated to upgrade Peru's Type 209/1200 submarines, the BAP Chipana, BAP Angamos, BAP Antofagasta and BAP Pisagua, with a contract with ThyssenKrupp Marine Systems being made for further assistance with SIMA.

During the 2017–present Peruvian political crisis, the Navy of Peru was involved in political scandals. During the first impeachment process against president Martín Vizcarra, the next in the order of succession to the presidency, President of the Congress Manuel Merino, had been in contact with the Commanding General of the Navy saying that he was attempting to remove Vizcarra from office. While the 2021 Peruvian general election was underway, the imprisoned former head of the National Intelligence Service (SIN) Vladimiro Montesinos was able to make phone calls from a landline telephone at the Centro de Reclusión de Máxima Seguridad (CEREC) at the Callao Naval Base to organize projects and campaign support for Keiko Fujimori in the Vladi-audios scandal.

Organization 

The current Commander-in-Chief of the Peruvian Navy is Admiral Alberto Alcalá Luna. Naval Forces are subordinated to the Ministry of Defense and ultimately to the President as Chief Supreme of the Peruvian Armed Forces. They are organized as follows:

 Comandancia General de la Marina (Navy General Command)
 Estado Mayor General de la Marina (Navy General Staff)
 Inspectoría General de la Marina (Navy General Inspectorate)

Operational units are divided between three commands:

Comandancia General de Operaciones del Pacífico
Pacific Operations General Command, it comprises the following units:
  Fuerza de Superficie (Surface Force)
  Fuerza de Submarinos (Submarine Force)
  Fuerza de Aviación Naval (Naval Aviation Force)
  Fuerza de Infantería de Marina (Naval Infantry Force)
  Fuerza de Operaciones Especiales (Special Operations Force)

Comandancia General de Operaciones de la Amazonía
Amazon Operations General Command, tasked with river patrolling in the Peruvian portion of the Amazon Basin.

Dirección General de Capitanías y Guardacostas
Directive General of Captains and Coast Guard, oversees Coast Guard operations

Coast Guard

Coast Guard, tasked with law enforcement on Peruvian territorial waters, rivers and lakes. The Peruvian Coast Guard often performs anti-drug trafficking operations within the nation's waters. The Coast Guard has approximately 1,000 personnel.

Naval Aviation

The Naval Aviation Force : (Fuerza de Aviación Naval, AVINAV) is the air branch of the Peruvian Navy, its roles include anti-submarine warfare, anti-surface warfare, maritime surveillance, reconnaissance and transport of marine personnel. It is also responsible for airborne operations of the Peruvian Marines. Naval Aviation has about 800 personnel.

Naval Infantry

Naval Infantry Brigade
1st Naval Infantry Battalion – Ancón
2nd Naval Infantry Battalion – Ancón
Amphibious Support Group
Fire support Group
Commando Grouping
Engineers Unit

Other units
3rd Naval Infantry Battalion – Tumbes
4th Naval Infantry Battalion – Puno
1st Jungle Naval Infantry Battalion – Iquitos
2nd Jungle Naval Infantry Battalion – Pucallpa
Naval Infantry Detachment Litoral Sur – Mollendo

Bases

Ancón – Naval Infantry headquarters and base
Callao – Main naval base, dockyard and naval aviation base, Naval Medical Center which contains the US Navy unit Naval Medical Research Unit Six
Chimbote – Minor base and dockyard
Iquitos – On the Amazon river
Paita – Minor base
Pisco – Minor base
Puno – On Lake Titicaca
San Juan de Marcona – Naval aviation base

Although most of the fleet is based at Callao, this has not been considered an ideal location since it is also the main outlet for Peruvian trade, causing space and security problems. In the 1980s the building of a new naval base at Chimbote was considered though high costs and a poor economic situation made the project unfeasible.

Personnel

Ranks

Ranks of the officers of the Navy
Ranks of the sub-officers of the Navy
Ranks of the enlisted of the navy

Ships 
Ships of the Peruvian Navy are prefixed BAP, which stands for Buque Armada Peruana (Peruvian Navy Ship).

Current ships 
{| class="wikitable"
! style="text-align: left;"|Ship
! style="text-align: left;"|Origin
! style="text-align: left;"|Type
! style="text-align: left;"|Class
! style="text-align: left;"|In service
! style="text-align: left;"|Notes
|-
! colspan="7" style="background:#f9f9f9;" |Submarines (4 in service, 2 in upgrade)
|-
| 
| 
| diesel-electric submarine
| Type 209/1200
| 
| ex-BAP Casma.
|-
| 
| 
| diesel-electric submarine
| Type 209/1200
| 
| Currently being upgraded in SIMA Callao shipyard since January 2020.
|-
| 
| 
| diesel-electric submarine
| Type 209/1200
| 
| 
|-
| 
| 
| diesel-electric submarine
| Type 209/1200
| 
| ex-BAP Blume. Currently being upgraded in SIMA Callao shipyard since December 2017.
|-
| 
| 
| diesel-electric submarine
| Type 209/1100
| 
| Upgraded in 2008
|-
| 
| 
| diesel-electric submarine
| Type 209/1100
| 
| Upgraded in 2008
|-
! colspan="7" style="background:#f9f9f9;" |Guided missile frigates (7 in service)
|-
| 
| 
| guided missile frigate
| 
| 
|
|-
| 
| 
| guided missile frigate
| 
| 
| Ordered in 1973. Laid down in SIMA Callao shipyard and commissioned in 1984 as BAP Montero until 2017, when became fleet flagship
|-
| 
| 
| guided missile frigate
| 
| 
| Ordered in 1973. Laid down in SIMA Callao shipyard and commissioned in 1987.
|
|-
| 
| 
| guided missile frigate
| 
| 
| ex-Orsa (F-567), overhauled and upgraded in SIMA Callao shipyard along with BAP Bolognesi. Currently in sea trials.
|-
| 
| 
| guided missile frigate
| 
| 
| ex-Lupo (F-564)
|-
| 
| 
| guided missile frigate
| 
| 
| ex-Perseo (F-566), overhauled and upgraded in SIMA Callao shipyard with locally-made CMS and ESM systems, a Kronos NV 3D radar, MASS countermeasures system and 4 MM40 Block III Exocet missiles replacing Otomat.
|-
| 
| 
| guided missile frigate
| 
| 
| ex-Sagittario (F-565)
|-
! colspan="7" style="background:#f9f9f9;" |Guided missile corvettes (8 in service)
|-
| BAP Velarde (CM-21)
| 
| fast attack craft
| 
| 
|
|-
| BAP Santillana (CM-22)
| 
| fast attack craft
| 
| 
|
|-
| BAP De los Heros (CM-23)
| 
| fast attack craft
| 
| 
|
|-
| BAP Herrera (CM-24)
| 
| fast attack craft
| 
| 
|
|-
| BAP Larrea (CM-25)
| 
| fast attack craft
| 
| 
|
|-
| BAP Sánchez Carrión (CM-26)
| 
| fast attack craft
| 
| 
|
|-
|  BAP Ferre (CM-27)
| 
| fast attack craft
| 
| 
| ex-Gyeonjyu (PCC-758). Built in 1985. Transferred from Republic of Korea Navy in July 2016.
|-
|  BAP Guise (CM-28)
| 
| fast attack craft
| 
| 
| ex-Suncheon (PCC-767). Built in 1987. Transferred from Republic of Korea Navy in July 2021. Commissioned in 2022.
|-
! colspan="7" style="background:#f9f9f9;" |Offshore Patrols vessels (7 in service)
|-
| BAP Guardiamarina San Martin (PO-201)
| 
| Frigate
| 
| 
| ex-. Operated by the Peruvian Coast Guard
|
|-
| BAP Rio Pativilca (PM-204)
| 
| Offshore Patrol Vessel
| Rio Pativilca" |PGCP-50 offshore patrol vessel
| 
| Ordered in 2013. Derived design of Taegeuk-class patrol vessel from Republic of Korea Navy. Laid down in SIMA Chimbote shipyard and commissioned on March 18, 2016. Operated by the Peruvian Coast Guard
|
|-
| BAP Rio Cañete (PM-205)
| 
| Offshore Patrol Vessel
| Rio Pativilca" |PGCP-50 offshore patrol vessel
| 
| Ordered in 2013. Derived design of Taegeuk-class patrol vessel from Republic of Korea Navy. Laid down in SIMA Chimbote shipyard and commissioned on March 18, 2016. Operated by the Peruvian Coast Guard
|
|-
| BAP Rio Piura (PM-206)
| 
| Offshore Patrol Vessel
| Rio Pativilca" |PGCP-50 offshore patrol vessel
| 
| Laid down in SIMA Chimbote shipyard and commissioned on May 3rd, 2017. Operated by the Peruvian Coast Guard
|
|-
| BAP Rio Quilca (PM-207)
| 
| Offshore Patrol Vessel
| Rio Pativilca" |PGCP-50 offshore patrol vessel
| 
| Laid down in SIMA Chimbote shipyard and commissioned on May 3, 2017. Operated by the Peruvian Coast Guard
|
|-
| BAP Rio Tumbes (PM-208)
| 
| Offshore Patrol Vessel
| Rio Pativilca" |PGCP-50 offshore patrol vessel
| 
| Laid down in SIMA Chimbote shipyard and commissioned on March 17, 2021. Operated by the Peruvian Coast Guard
|
|-
| BAP Rio Locumba (PM-209)
| 
| Offshore Patrol Vessel
| Rio Pativilca" |PGCP-50 offshore patrol vessel
| 
| Laid down in SIMA Chimbote shipyard and commissioned on March 17, 2021. Operated by the Peruvian Coast Guard
|
|-
! colspan="7" style="background:#f9f9f9;" |Amphibious (10 in service, 1 in construction)
|-
| 
| 
| Landing Platform, Dock
| 
| 
| Ordered on July 13, 2013; laid down in SIMA Callao shipyard, launched on April 25, 2017; commissioned on June 21, 2018.
|-
| 
| 
| Landing Platform, Dock
| 
| 
| Ordered on March 15, 2018; laid down in SIMA Callao shipyard.
|-
| 
| 
| Landing Ship, Tank
| Terrebonne Parish class
| 
| ex-. Sunk as target 30 September 2021
|-
| 
| 
| Landing Ship, Tank
| Terrebonne Parish class
| 
| ex-
|-
|Seven in service
|
| Landing Craft Air Cushion
| Griffon Hoverwork 2000TD 
|
|
|-
! colspan="7" style="background:#f9f9f9;" |River gunboats vessels (6 in service)
|-
| BAP Loreto (CF-11)
| 
| River gunboat
| Loreto class
| 
|
|-
| BAP Amazonas (CF-12)
| 
| River gunboat
| Loreto class
| 
|
|-
| BAP Marañón (CF-13)
| 
| River gunboat
| Marañón class
| 
|
|-
| BAP Ucayali (CF-14)
| 
| River gunboat
| Marañón class
| 
|
|-
| BAP Clavero (CF-15)
| 
| River gunboat
| Clavero class
| 
| Laid down in the SIMA Iquitos shipyard. Damaged by an uncontrolled fire in her first operational deployment on May 25, 2010; leaving two crewmen badly injured. Returned to service on July 27, 2012, during the BRACOLPER 2012 exercise.
|-
| BAP Castilla (CF-16)
| 
| River gunboat
| Clavero class
| 
| Laid down on April 9, 2010, in the SIMA Iquitos shipyard, launched on June 8, 2013, and commissioned on March 14, 2016, second and final ship of its class, has some improvements over its sister ship, mainly in armament
|-
! colspan="7" style="background:#f9f9f9;" |Training ships (2 in service)
|-
| 
| 
| Sail training ship
| –
| 
| laid down on December 8, 2012, in the SIMA Callao shipyard, commissioned January 27, 2016, with an estimated cost of US$50 million.
|-
| BAP Marte (ALY-313)
| 
| Sailing yacht
| –
| 
| assigned to the Peruvian Naval School as a training ship
|-
! colspan="7" style="background:#f9f9f9;" |Tugs and support ships (5 in service)
|-
| BAP Unanue (AMB-160)
| 
| Diving support ship
| Sotoyomo class
| 
| ex-
|-
| BAP San Lorenzo (ART-323)
| 
| Torpedo recovery vessel
| –
| 
| 
|-
| 
| 
| Diving support offshore tugboat
| Morales class
| 
| Ordered in 2014, 50 TBP class locally designed tugboat, equipped to support diving, firefighting and rescue operations. Delivered in November 2016
|-
| BAP Selendón (ARB-129)
| 
| Harbour tugboat
| 20 TBP class tug
| 
| Built in SIMA Callao shipyard, ordered in 2011. Delivered in the first quarter of 2012.
|-
| BAP Medina (ARB-130)
| 
| Harbour tugboat
| 20 TBP class tug
| 
| Built in SIMA Callao shipyard, ordered in 2011. Delivered in late 2012.
|-
! colspan="7" style="background:#f9f9f9;" |Tankers and barges (4 in service)
|-
| BAP Caloyeras (ACA-111)
| 
| Water barge
| YW-83 class
| 
| ex-US YW-128
|-
| BAP Noguera (ACP-118)
| 
| Fuel barge
| YO type
| 
| ex-US YO-221
|-
| BAP Gauden (ACP-119)
| 
| Fuel barge
| YO type
| 
| ex-US YO-171
|-
| 
| 
| Replenishment Ship
| Amsterdam class 
| 
| ex-Built in 1995, acquired in July 2014 from the Royal Netherlands Navy, commissioned on December 4, 2014, at the Den Helder naval base, Netherlands.
|-
! colspan="7" style="background:#f9f9f9;" |Hospital vessels (10 in service, 1 in construction)
|-
| BAP Rio Yavarí 
| 
| River hospital ship
| Yavarí PIAS class
| 
| Built by Sima Iquitos shipyard, commissioned in 2021.
|
|-
| BAP Rio Putumayo II 
| 
| River hospital ship
| Napo PIAS class
| 
|Built in Sima Iquitos shipyard, commissioned in 2016.
|
|-
| BAP Rio Putumayo I 
| 
| River hospital ship
| Napo PIAS class
| 
|Built in Sima Iquitos shipyard, commissioned in 2015.
|-
| BAP Morona 
| 
| River hospital ship
| Napo PIAS class
| 
| Built in Sima Iquitos shipyard, commissioned in 2015.
|-
| BAP Rio Napo
| 
| River hospital ship
| Napo PIAS class
| 
| Built in Sima Iquitos shipyard, commissioned in 2013.
|-
| BAP Rio Yahuas (ABH-302)
| 
| River hospital ship
| Morona class
| 
| Ex BAP Morona (ABH-302)
|
|-
| BAP Corrientes (ABH-303)
| 
| Small river hospital craft
| –
| 
|
|-
| BAP Curaray (ABH-304)
| 
| Small river hospital craft
| –
| 
|
|-
| BAP Pastaza (ABH-305)
| 
| Small river hospital craft
| –
| 
|
|-
| BAP Lago Titicaca I
| 
| Lake hospital ship
| Lago Titicaca PIAS class
| 
| Built by SIMA Peru, commissioned in 2017.
|
|-
| 
| 
| Lake hospital ship
| Yaravi class
| 
| ex-Yapuraoperated by the Peruvian Coast Guard
|
|-
! colspan="7" style="background:#f9f9f9;" |Scientific research vessels (6 in service)
|-
| 
| 
| Oceanographic research ship
| NC-704 class
| 
| 95-m long steel-hulled vessel designed to operate in the Antarctic region as well as in Peruvian waters. Construction contract signed in December 2014 with Freire Shipyard. Keel-laying scheduled for June 22, 2015, to be delivered July 2016. Commissioned in May 2017.
|-
| BAP Stiglich (AH-172)
| 
| Hydrographic survey ship
| Morona class
| 
|
|-
| BAP Zimic (COMBSH-173)
| 
| Hydrographic survey ship
| 
| 
|  ex-HNLMS Abcoude minesweeper. ex-BAP Carrasco, repowered in 2006 with 2 Volvo Penta engines at SIMA Callao, in 2015 received a high power multibeam echosounder.
|-
| BAP La Macha (AEH-174)
| 
| Hydrographic survey ship
| –
| 
|
|-
| BAP Carrillo (AH-175)
| 
| Hydrographic survey ship
| 
| 
| ex-HNLMS van Hamel minesweeper
|-
| BAP Melo (AH-176)
| 
| Hydrographic survey ship
| 
| 
| ex-HNLMS van der Wel minesweeper. Repowered in 2006 with 2 Volvo Penta engines at SIMA Callao.
|}

Museum Ships

Recently Decommissioned Ships

Equipment

Peacekeeping operations
The Peruvian Navy has been actively involved in several United Nations Peacekeeping Operations. As of June 2006 Naval Infantry and Special Operations troops have been deployed to United Nations Peacekeeping Force in Cyprus (UNFICYP) (embedded in the Argentine forces ) and United Nations Stabilization Mission in Haiti (MINUSTAH). Peruvian naval officers have also been deployed to United Nations Organization Mission in the Democratic Republic of the Congo (MONUC), United Nations Operation in Côte d'Ivoire (UNOCI), United Nations Mission in Sudan (UNMIS) as United Nations Militar Observers (UNMOs). By 2012 the Peruvian Navy sent its first officer to serve in United Nations Interim Security Force for Abyei.

Gallery

See also
 Battle of Angamos
 Battle of Iquique
 Battle of Pacocha
 Ironclad Huáscar
 Miguel Grau
 SIFOREX
 War of the Pacific
 List of Peruvian steam frigates

Notes

Sources
Baker III, Arthur D., The Naval Institute Guide to Combat Fleets of the World 2002–2003. Naval Institute Press, 2002.
Basadre, Jorge, Historia de la República del Perú. Editorial Universitaria, 1983.
"La base de Chimbote", Caretas, 855: 31 (June 17, 1985).

Ortiz Sotelo, Jorge, Apuntes para la historia de los submarinos peruanos. Biblioteca Nacional, 2001.

Rial, Juan, Los militares tras el fin del régimen de Fujimori-Montesinos.
"Los Programas de Renovacion y Modernizacion de la Marina de Guerra del Peru", Alejo Marchessini – Revista Fuerzas de Defensa y Seguridad (FDS) N° 430. Paginas 32 a 35.
"Entrevista al Almirante Carlos Tejada Mera, Comandante General de la MArina de Guerra del Peru", Alejo Marchessini – Revista Fuerzas de Defensa y Seguridad (FDS) N° 430. Paginas 36 a 43.

External links
 Official Peruvian Navy Website
  Maquina de Combate – Photo gallery.
 Servicio Industrial de la Marina  – Peruvian Navy Shipyards. In English and Spanish.
 The Peruvian Navy: The XIX Century Maritime Campaigns – a series of articles covering the history of the 19th century Peruvian Navy by Juan del Campo.

 
1821 establishments in Peru